Funhalouro District is a district of Inhambane Province in south-east Mozambique. Its principal town is Funhalouro. The district is located at the west of the province, and borders with Mabote District in the north, Inhassoro District in the northeast, Massinga and Morrumbene Districts in the east, Homoine District in the southeast, Inharrime District in the south, and with Chigubo District of Gaza Province in the west. It has a population of 37.925 as of 2007.

Geography
The Changane River, a left tributary of the Limpopo River, makes the western border of the district and of Inhambane province. This is the only big river in the district.

History
The area was traditionally populated by the Mazive people. In 1942, it was split between Massinga Circunscrição and newly established Vilanculo Circunscrição, a type of administrative unit used in Portuguese colonies in Africa. The Mazive lands were administered from Posto de Funhalouro, which belonged to Vilanculo Circunscrição. In July 1986, a new administrative division of Mozambique was introduced, and Funhalouro District was established.

Administrative divisions
The district is divided into two postos, Funhalouro (four localities) and Tome (two localities).

Demographics
As of 2005, 42% of the population of the district was younger than 15 years. 21% did speak Portuguese. The Roman Catholic Church was the predomininant church. 79% were analphabetic, mostly women.

Economy

Agriculture
The main agricultural products are peanuts, millet, sorghum, cassava, cotton, and cashew.

Transportation

References

Districts in Inhambane Province
States and territories established in 1986